Soul Night/Live! is a live album by saxophonist Willis Jackson which was recorded in New York City in 1964 and released on the Prestige label in 1966. This was the third album to be released from the same performance following Live! Action and Jackson's Action! with a fourth later release Tell It... appearing in 1967.

Reception

Allmusic awarded the album 4 stars.

Track listing 
All compositions by Willis Jackson except as indicated
 "The Man I Love" (George Gershwin, Ira Gershwin) - 5:40   
 "Perdido" (Juan Tizol) - 9:00   
 "Thunderbird" - 5:10   
 "Polka Dots and Moonbeams" (Jimmy Van Heusen, Johnny Burke) - 5:50   
 "All Soul" (Curtis Lewis) - 5:00   
 "Flamingo" (Ted Grouya, Edmund Anderson) - 5:40  
Recorded at The Allegro in New York City on March 21, 1964

Personnel 
Willis Jackson - tenor saxophone
Frank Robinson - trumpet
Carl Wilson - organ
Pat Martino - guitar
Joe Hadrick  - drums

References 

Willis Jackson (saxophonist) live albums
1966 live albums
Prestige Records live albums